On 28 February 2016, a man in the Indian city of Thane fatally stabbed 14 members of his family before taking his own life.

Details
The incident took place at 1:00 am in Thane district of Maharashtra. The killer is reported to have sedated his victims before slitting their throats with a large knife, and later hanging himself. Seven children, six women and one male are among those killed.

The suspect's name has been given in different sources as Hasnel Anwar Warekar, Husnail Varekar and Asnain Anwar Warekar, aged 35.

A 21-year-old woman from the family survived and was taken to a hospital.

References

External links
 Scene Outside The Thane House, India Express Online

February 2016 crimes in Asia
February 2016 events in India
History of Maharashtra (1947–present)
Mass stabbings in Asia
Mass murder in 2016
Murder–suicides in Asia
Stabbing attacks in 2016
Thane
Knife attacks
2016 murders in India
Familicides
21st-century mass murder in India